Nicolae Grigore (born 12 March 1975 in Sibiu) is a former Romanian football player.

Honours
Gaz Metan Mediaș
Divizia B: 1999–2000
Voința Sibiu
Liga III: 2009–10
Liga IV: 2008–09

Notes

References

1975 births
Sportspeople from Sibiu
Romanian footballers
Liga I players
Liga II players
Liga III players
Russian Premier League players
Romanian expatriate footballers
Expatriate footballers in Russia
FC Inter Sibiu players
CS Gaz Metan Mediaș players
CSM Unirea Alba Iulia players
FC Spartak Vladikavkaz players
FC SKA-Khabarovsk players
CSU Voința Sibiu players
Living people
Association football defenders